Mamadou Bagayoko (born 21 May 1979) is a former professional footballer who played as a forward. Born in France, he represented Mali at international level.

Club career
Bagayoko was born in Paris. His debut at senior level came in 1999 for RC Strasbourg. He moved to AC Ajaccio in August 2003 and was seen as an integral figure in helping to keep the club in Ligue 1 that season.

Nantes signed him for around €1.3 million in July 2004 as a replacement for Marama Vahirua on a four-year contract but ended up moving on loan to OGC Nice in July 2005, helping them reach the final of the French League Cup which they lost 2–1 to Nancy.

In November 2010 he had a trial at Wolverhampton Wanderers.

On 23 December 2011, it was confirmed that Bagayoko would be joining Doncaster Rovers. The transfer eventually took place on 1 January 2012. He made his Doncaster debut in the 2–0 home loss to Notts County in the FA Cup. On 18 February 2012, Bagayoko scored two goals from the bench for Doncaster in their 3–2 loss away to Leeds United.

In January 2013, US Luzenac signed free agent Bagayoko.

Honours
FIFA World Youth Championship third place: 1999

References

External links

Yahoo Sports profile

1979 births
Living people
Footballers from Paris
Association football forwards
Citizens of Mali through descent
Malian footballers
French footballers
Mali international footballers
Mali under-20 international footballers
2002 African Cup of Nations players
2010 Africa Cup of Nations players
French sportspeople of Malian descent
USL Dunkerque players
FC Sens players
RC Strasbourg Alsace players
AC Ajaccio players
FC Nantes players
Al Wahda FC players
OGC Nice players
PAS Giannina F.C. players
Doncaster Rovers F.C. players
Ligue 1 players
Ligue 2 players
English Football League players
UAE Pro League players
Malian expatriate footballers
Expatriate footballers in Greece
Expatriate footballers in England
Malian expatriate sportspeople in England
Malian expatriate sportspeople in Greece